The Park Building is an historic building in Worcester, Massachusetts, USA.  Built in 1914, the 11 story structure was for many years one of Worcester's most prominent landmarks.  It has a steel frame, with an exterior that is dressed predominantly in limestone.  The first two floors have metal and plate glass store fronts, while the third floor has evenly spaced windows, separated by decorative limestone panels and topped by a cornice.  From the fourth to the ninth floors there is little decoration.  The top two floors have groups of windows separated by Tuscan columns, giving the appearance of a loggia.

The building was listed on the National Register of Historic Places in 1980.  As of 2016 it is an apartment building known as Park Plaza that is part of the Grid District, a commercial urban redevelopment project in downtown Worcester.

See also
National Register of Historic Places listings in northwestern Worcester, Massachusetts
National Register of Historic Places listings in Worcester County, Massachusetts

References

Office buildings on the National Register of Historic Places in Massachusetts
Neoclassical architecture in Massachusetts
Buildings and structures completed in 1914
Buildings and structures in Worcester, Massachusetts
National Register of Historic Places in Worcester, Massachusetts